Karachay may refer to:

 Karachay, a member of the Karachays, an indigenous people of the North Caucasus
 Karachay-Balkar language spoken by them
 Karachay Autonomous Oblast, a former autonomous unit in the Soviet Union
 Novy Karachay, a town in the Karachay-Cherkess Republic, Russia
 Lake Karachay, a lake in the Ural mountains of Russia
Karachay horse, a horse breed from the region

See also 
 Karachi (disambiguation)
 Qarachi (disambiguation)